The Much Honoured (abbreviated to The Much Hon.) is an honorific style applied to the holders of certain Scottish feudal baronies, lairds, and chiefs and chieftains.

Overview
There were around 350 identifiable local baronies in Scotland by the early fifteenth century and these could mostly be mapped against local parish boundaries. In addition, there are a small number of feudal earldoms (Aboyne, Angus, Arran, Breadalbane, Crawfurd-Lindsay, Dunbar, Errol, Lennox, Nithsdale, Orkney, Rothes, Wigtown), one feudal marquessate (Huntly) and one feudal dukedom (Hamilton), all held in baroneum, where there is entitlement. Of these, two earldoms are unclaimed, one is in dispute and the dukedom and marquessate are held by senior members of the Scottish peerage.

The highest-ranking feudal baron in Scotland is The Much Hon. The Baron of Renfrew, HRH The Duke of Rothesay; by tradition both titles being held concurrently by the heir apparent to the British throne. The Marquess of Huntly and The Earl of Eglinton and Winton are other notable title holders.

Historically, certain territorial lairds were permitted to style themselves "The Much Honoured". This practice is now considered obsolete. The official use of titles and honorifics in Scotland comes under the jurisdiction of the Court of the Lord Lyon in Edinburgh.

Usage
Historically, the honorific is used in association with three groups:

 Scots feudal barons. For example, The Much Hon. David Leslie, Baron of Leslie, or The Much Hon. The Baron of Leslie 
 Scots feudal earls. For example, The Much Hon. James Leslie, Earl of Rothes or The Much Hon. The Earl of Rothes
 Lairds. Now considered obsolete.

The eldest son of a Scots baron is entitled to be addressed by courtesy as the Younger (abbreviated to the Yr); the eldest daughter of a Scots baron, if heir apparent, is entitled to use the courtesy title The Maid of [name of barony] (e.g. David Leslie the Younger and The Maid of Leslie).

The honorific "The Much Honoured" is distinct from honorifics attaching to Peers of the Realm.

See also
 Forms of address in the United Kingdom
 Style (manner of address)
 The Honourable

References

Styles (forms of address)
Scottish titles